Ox Creek is a stream in Berrien County, in the U.S. state of Michigan. It is a tributary to the Paw Paw River.

According to tradition the name "Ox Creek" recalls an incident when oxen became mired while crossing the creek.

References

Rivers of Berrien County, Michigan
Rivers of Michigan